The Maktab Khana (meaning "House of Translation") was a bureau of records and translation established by the Mughal Emperor Akbar in Fatehpur Sikri around 1574. Emperor Akbar commissioned his most talented scribes and secretaries to translate the major texts of India from Sanskrit into Persian and to illustrate the manuscripts in the royal workshops. Of these texts included the Mahabharata into the Razmnāma (Persian: رزم نامہ, lit. Book of War), the Ramayana, and the Rajatarangini. Various Arabic encyclopedias and histories were also translated, as well as the entirety of the Baburnama, the memoirs of Akbar's grandfather and founder of the Mughal dynasty, Babur. With this bureau, Akbar aspired to "form a basis for a united search for truth" and "enable the people to understand the true spirit of their religion."

See also
 Din-i Ilahi
 Ganga–Jamuni Tehzeeb
 Mughal painting
 Razmnama

References

16th-century establishments in Asia
Mughal Court
Fatehpur Sikri
Libraries in Uttar Pradesh
Emperors of India
Libraries established in the 16th century